Jim Chapman (born February 10, 1949) is a Canadian radio and TV personality, musician, journalist and author.

Personal life
Jim Chapman was born to Wilfred “Chappie” Chapman and Helen (Bettger) Chapman in London, Ontario, Canada on February 10, 1949. He has an older sister, Marianne, and a younger brother, Ted. Even as a young child, Jim was fascinated by music and writing, both of which became lifelong passions. He attended local schools but dropped out in 1966 to pursue dreams of rock and roll stardom.

Working musician
Jim played with several local bands from 1964 to 1967, and in 1968 his band The Bluesmen Revue signed a recording contract with Columbia Records in the U.S. that saw the release of "Spin the Bottle", a local hit. They toured in the U.S., including a two-week engagement at the legendary Trude Heller's in New York City. A falling out with their U.S. management company and dissatisfaction with Columbia’s plans for them spelled the end of their record contract, and, dispirited by their failure to crack the big time, the band split up in early 1969.  In 1970, Jim joined popular Canadian showband Leather and Lace for several months and eventually played bass for rockabilly legend Ronnie Hawkins in 1972.  In 1973 became the bassist for Homespun, an up-and-coming act that had been tapped for a contract with A&M Records before they broke up over "artistic differences" in 1976.

The 70’s and 80’s
With partners Sandy Wilson and Brian Ferriman (later to manage country star Michelle Wright), Jim formed the successful musicians' management company, "SuperVision". They also owned and operated Springfield Sound Studios, where folk legend Stan Rogers recorded his iconic Fogarty's Cove and Turnaround albums. Todd Rundgren, John Allan Cameron, Helix, Jethro Tull, Crowbar, Matt Minglewood, Bernard Purdie, and Budgie were among many other notable acts that recorded there. Jim was also involved in "The Jingle People", with dozens of their musical creations being heard on regional radio and TV for years.  

In 1977, Jim opened "Jim Chapman Associates", a full-service advertising and promotions company based in London but servicing clients across Ontario.  Unfortunately, the year after his marriage in 1979, ill health forced him to retire from the business rat race. Seeking a less stressful way of life, he and his new bride Carlyn put together a musical act and went on the road across eastern Canada until the late 80s.

The 90's
After settling back in London, Jim built another recording studio and started a jingle company again, quickly attracting clients like Ontario Hydro, ParticipACTION, The Ontario Home and School Association, London’s Public Utilities Commission, The London 200 Celebration, and Kraft General Foods. He also wrote and recorded the iconic “Tear ‘Em Up Tigers” theme song for the London-based Detroit Tigers farm team. It gained modest international recognition as an anthem for the organization on its way to a US Eastern League baseball championship in 1989, in addition to getting significant local media coverage and raising thousands of dollars for charity. As an adventure, Jim took over the duties of Marketing and Promotions Manager for the team for a season but then left to devote more time to his business.

The Morning Show Musical Maestro
In 1988, Jim was contracted to write novelty songs for Peter Garland's top-rated morning show on CFPL 980 Radio, reaching a large audience across southern Ontario. As "The Morning Show Musical Maestro" from 1988 until 1991, Jim was the only staff songwriter at any Canadian radio station.  He turned out dozens of humorous and satirical songs, and produced two albums of his tunes that raised thousands of dollars for charity. Some of his songs were heard across Canada on the CBC, including "Stand Up for Canada, Eh!" It was recorded by the True Grit Band that included Canadian Prime Minister Jean Chrétien and future City of London Mayor Joe Fontana, and was used as the theme for a nationwide campaign to promote Canadian unity during the 1992 Referendum.

Media Personality
That same year, Jim was offered a job as a talk show host at London’s CJBK Radio, fulfilling a lifelong dream of having his own radio program. After a year there and a subsequent two-year stint at CKSL, he returned to CJBK as the host of Talk of the Town, which quickly became southern Ontario's top forum for public discussion.[16] He interviewed many well-known and influential newsmakers of the day, including prime ministers, premiers, U.S. governors, Hollywood legend Steve Allen, Forbes magazine publisher Steve Forbes, Canadian military hero General Lewis Mackenzie, international con artist Julius Melnitzer, Canadian music legends Grant Smith, Ronnie Hawkins and Skip Prokop, hockey legends Mark and Dale Hunter, Tiger Williams, and Walter Gretzky, baseball great Bob Feller, best-selling authors Pierre Berton, Diana Gabaldon, Marianne Williamson, Bishop John S. Spong, Tom Harpur, and Richard Marcinko, TV personalities Gordon Pinsent, Don Harron, Red Green, and David Suzuki, and many more. He was hired as a regular news commentator on CFPL television and also hosted the thrice-weekly Jim Chapman Show evenings on the Rogers TV Network. He was a popular columnist with The London Free Press and Business London magazine for two decades, and was the first person in London media to host his own radio and TV shows while writing regular newspaper and magazine columns as well.

Near Death Experience
In 1999 Jim suffered a fatal heart attack and was left brain-dead in a local ER. He was eventually resuscitated, but not before having a transformative Near Death Experience. Emergency surgery after a second serious heart attack just days later left him very ill and incapacitated for some time, during which his loyal listeners filled his home with dozens of bouquets of flowers and hundreds of get-well cards.[22] [23] He told the story of what he called his “adventure” in Heart and Soul, a memoir that became a regional bestseller and generated thousands of dollars for charity. For the next few years, in addition to his media work, Jim travelled extensively and as far afield as Seattle, Washington and Dallas, Texas, speaking about his Near Death Experience and its aftermath.

Back in the Limelight Again
Leaving CJBK in 2004, Jim took several months off to rest before going back to the airwaves with another news program. The Jim Chapman News Hour on CHRW-FM, a 60-minute daily broadcast featuring his analysis of stories in the news and their significance for his listeners. After a serious illness in 2005, he was inspired to write another book, Come Back to Life, that was released to critical and popular approval. It related the story of the years since his Near Death Experience and how his life in the interim had been affected by it. As a public figure willing to write and talk about very private things, Jim became a role model for many other people who have suffered from depression, fear of death, and a reluctance to share their own life-altering experiences for fear of ridicule. 

Jim continued broadcasting and writing for the London Free Press and Business London Magazine, but retired from the media in 2007 to run in the Ontario Provincial Election[36] for the Progressive Conservatives, though he departed from the party platform when it did not reflect his beliefs, as noted prominently in the Globe and Mail newspaper. Unsuccessful at the polls, he decided to retire altogether, planning to read, write, play music, and work on his collection of classic cars. 

But he found an unstructured life unsatisfactory and soon opened a marketing and communications consultancy, quickly recruiting several major clients. In 2008 he was invited to go back on the radio as the host of the daily Jim Chapman NewsHour on CFPL (AM) radio,  and began writing again for The London Free Press and Business London Magazine. In 2009 he authored his second book, Mind How You Go, based on a collection of inspirational sayings submitted by his radio listeners. He also founded Bettger Books, a publishing company that has released titles by, among others, Canadian authors Herman Goodden, Sonia Halpern, and broadcasting legend Dick Williams, as well as Jim’s own works. 

In late 2009 Jim solicited a small group of politically-minded investors and launched The Voice of London, the city's first electronic political newsmagazine, and an instant subscription success. Created with the purpose of informing voters about the upcoming civic election, due to Jim’s heavy workload it ceased operations after election day in October 2010.

The following year Jim left radio again to devote more time to his family, consulting business, writing, and his collection of automobiles that over the years has included, among other noteworthy vehicles, a 1931/80 Ford/Shay Model A roadster, 1948 Mercury sedan, 1951 Jaguar Mark V saloon, 1954 Mercury sedan, 1954 Pontiac coupe, 1957 Ford Thunderbird roadster, 1957 MGA 1500 sports roadster, 1958 Jaguar XK-150 coupe, 1961 Lincoln Continental convertible, 1963 Studebaker GT Hawk, 1964 Mercury Comet Caliente convertible,1965 Datsun Fairlady sports roadster, 1966 Pontiac Parisienne Sport Coupe, 1969 Mercedes Benz 230 sedan, 1971 Mercedes Benx 280SL roadster, 1972 Buick Riviera, 1975 Pontiac Grand Lemans Sport Coupe, 1983 Mercedes Benz C-300 convertible conversion, 1990 Buick Reatta convertible, and a 1990 Mazda Miata sports roadster.  His latest special interest car is a 1955 Ford Thunderbird that once belonged to Buster Crabbe, star of the Buck Rogers and Flash Gordon movie serials. 

In 2011, Jim capped a lifelong interest in the sport by becoming one of the founding partners of the San Francisco Bulls, an ECHL professional hockey team affiliated with the San Jose Sharks of the National Hockey League. In 2017 he closed his consulting business and retired again, “this time for good”. 

For several years he gigged around the area as a musician in The Incontinentals, Frankly Scarlett, and The Les Holmes Trio Plus, and as a solo act. A few years ago released "Lost and Found", a CD of his original songs that had been recorded at Springfield Sound in the mid-70s but were lost for more than 3 decades. When Covid put a stop to performing in 2020, Jim used the downtime to research and write a 190,000-word book about his life in music and particularly the explosive London music scene in the 1960’s. “Making Notes” is scheduled for publication in early summer, 2022.   He has also amassed an outstanding collection of vintage and historical electric musical instruments.

This Time, Social Media
Responding to repeated requests from fans of his media career and music, and his frequent and diverse posts on social media, in 2022 Jim launched a new website, designed and developed by SmartWebPros.com Inc. in London, ON. The website, jimchapman.ca, features blogs, articles, pictures, and a subscription newsletter designed to help illuminate the important issues of the day. It also offers information on his books, music, car and instrument collections, and, a lifelong interest, Canada’s health care system. Not quite as “retired” as he’d planned, Jim continues to be in demand as a performer, writer, and public speaker.

References

External links
 Jim's website
 SmartWebPros.com Inc.
 The Voice of London
 Jim's Show on AM 980
 Canoe's page on The Bluesmen Revue
 Near Death Experience Research Foundation's review of Heart and Soul
 The Jim Chapman Newshour on iTunes

1949 births
Living people
Musicians from London, Ontario
Writers from London, Ontario
Canadian radio hosts
Canadian non-fiction writers
Canadian male journalists
Canadian male non-fiction writers
Journalists from Ontario